The 1956 United States House of Representatives elections was an election for the United States House of Representatives to elect members to serve in the 85th United States Congress. They were held for the most part on November 6, 1956, while Maine held theirs on September 10. They coincided with the re-election of President Dwight D. Eisenhower.

With no major national issues and the economic upswing of the 1950s in full force, voters generally chose to uphold the status quo, keeping the Republican president and the Democratic Congress.

Overall results

Special elections 
In these special elections, the winner was seated during 1956 or before January 3, 1957; ordered by election date.

Alabama

Arizona

Arkansas

California

Colorado

Connecticut

Delaware

Florida

Georgia

Idaho

Illinois

Indiana

Iowa

Kansas

Kentucky

Louisiana

Maine

Maryland

Massachusetts

Michigan

Minnesota

Mississippi

Missouri

Montana

Nebraska

Nevada

New Hampshire

New Jersey

New Mexico

New York

North Carolina

North Dakota

Ohio

Oklahoma

Oregon

Pennsylvania

Rhode Island

South Carolina

South Dakota

Tennessee

Texas

Utah

Vermont

Virginia

Washington

West Virginia

Wisconsin

Wyoming

Non-voting delegates

Alaska Territory

See also
 1956 United States elections
 1956 United States Senate elections
 1956 United States presidential election
 1956 United States gubernatorial elections
 84th United States Congress
 85th United States Congress

Notes

References 

 
November 1956 events in the United States